The 1961 Harvard Crimson football team was an American football team that represented Harvard University during the 1961 NCAA University Division football season. Harvard was co-champion of the Ivy League.

In their fifth year under head coach John Yovicsin, the Crimson compiled a 6–3 record but and outscored opponents 160 to 97. Alex W. “Pete” Hart was the team captain.

The Crimson's 6–1 conference record tied for best in the Ivy League standings. Harvard shared the title though it had lost to the other co-champion, Columbia, during the season. The Crimson outscored Ivy opponents 143 to 60. 

Harvard played its home games at Harvard Stadium in the Allston neighborhood of Boston, Massachusetts.

Schedule

References

Harvard
Harvard Crimson football seasons
Ivy League football champion seasons
Harvard Crimson football
1960s in Boston